Carcare (locally Corcre) is a comune (municipality) in the Province of Savona in the Italian region Liguria, located about  west of Genoa and about  northwest of Savona.

Carcare borders the following municipalities: Altare, Cairo Montenotte, Cosseria, Mallare, Pallare, and Plodio.

The church of St. John the Baptist houses a 17th-century crucifix by Anton Maria Maragliano. Of the 16th-century castle, only ruins remain today. Singer-songwriter Annalisa hails from Carcare.

References

Cities and towns in Liguria